Alexander Forrester Brown was an Indian industrialist who served as a member of the Madras Legislative Council from 1865 to 1867.

Brown began his career as an employee of Parry before being appointed as a director of the Devalah Central-Gold Mines. In 1880, he was appointed Director of the Oriental Bank Corporation. Brown was elected in 1866-67 as the President of the Madras Chamber of Commerce and was re-elected in 1868.

Brown was appointed additional member of the Madras Legislative Council on 2 December 1865 and served until 1867.

Notes 

19th-century Indian people
Year of birth missing
Place of birth missing
Year of death missing
Place of death missing